Bartolomeo Nazari (May 31, 1693 – August 24, 1758) was an Italian painter of the late-Baroque, mainly active in Venice as a portraitist.

Biography
Born in Clusone, near Bergamo. By 1716, he had become an apprentice under Angelo Trevisani, but visited in 1723 the Roman studio of Angelo's brother, the Venetian Francesco Trevisani, and then also studied with Benedetto Luti. Nazari likely knew personally Fra Galgario, the renowned portraitist from Bergamo, and is described by some as a pupil. He returns to Venice in 1724, and is registered with the Fraglia dei Pittori by 1726. In 1744, he traveled to Frankfurt to paint the emperor Charles VII and his family and other members of the court.  In 1756, he was inducted into the newly founded Accademia di Belle Arti of Venice. His son Nazario Nazari was also a painter, as was his daughter Maria. Among his patrons were Consul Joseph Smith and the former general Johann Matthias von der Schulenburg (who owned over eight diverse portrait paintings). He painted the portraits of a number of operatic singers including Farinelli. He died in Milan, returning from Genoa, where he had painted the Doge.

Works

Sources
 The Nazari-A Forgotten Family of Venetian Portrait Painters,  F.J.B. Watson. The Burlington Magazine (1949); page 75-79.

External links

1693 births
1758 deaths
18th-century Italian painters
Italian male painters
Painters from Bergamo
Rococo painters
Italian Baroque painters
People from Clusone
18th-century Italian male artists